Attorney General Moore may refer to:

Alfred Moore (1755–1810), Attorney General of North Carolina
George Fletcher Moore (1798–1886), Attorney-General of Western Australia
Jacob Moore (1829–1886), Attorney General of Delaware
Mike Moore (American politician) (born 1952), Attorney General of Mississippi
Richard Moore (Irish lawyer) (1783–1857), Attorney-General for Ireland

See also
General Moore (disambiguation)